Sri Ganganagar Airport is located at Lalgarh jattan, 20 kilometres South-East of Sri Ganganagar, in the state of Rajasthan, India. It is owned and operated by the State Government of Rajasthan. The airport is spread over 65 acres, has a 1300 metre long runway and a 4410 square metre apron for two small aircraft. A 125 square metre rest house serves as a terminal building.

The district administration plans to expand the airport at a cost of 28.5 crore to enable the operation of larger aircraft. 
The State Civil Aviation Department signed a Memorandum of Understanding (MoU) with the Indian Army in November 2017, allowing the Army to use the airstrip for 10 years.

References

Airports in Rajasthan
Sri Ganganagar district
Airports with year of establishment missing